A beefsteak is a steak cut from beef cattle.

Beefsteak may also refer to:

 Perilla, beefsteak plant, also known as perilla and shiso
 Beefsteak (tomato), a name given to a type of large, meaty tomatoes
 Fistulina hepatica, beefsteak fungus
 Beefsteak mushroom, an alternate name for the false morel
 Beefsteak (banquet), a celebratory dinner, generally held in the New York City area
 Beefsteak Breads, a former brand name of Old HB; sold to Grupo Bimbo.
 Beefsteak Club, a type of gentlemen's private club
 Beefsteak Nazi, a term used to describe communists and socialists who joined the Nazi Party

See also 
 Beef (disambiguation)
 Steak (disambiguation)